Nuyorican rap is a fusion genre of hip hop, Latin hip hop, East Coast hip hop and reggaeton that embodies aspects of East Coast  Stateside Puerto Rican (Nuyorican) culture and is typically performed by American or Puerto Rican rappers and musicians of Puerto Rican descent.

See also
 Latin hip hop
 Latin trap
 List of Nuyorican rappers
 Nuyorican Poets Cafe
 Reggaeton

Hip hop genres
Music of New York City
Puerto Rican culture in New York City